Jean-Baptiste d'Ornano, Marquis de  (1581–1626) was a French nobleman and Marshal of France (1626).

Biography

He was the son of Alphonse d'Ornano and grandson to Sampiero Corso. Early in his childhood he was prepared for coming to court and was also trained in strategy. He showed a lot of skill in the latter, so already at the age of 14 he commanded a company of Chevau-légers at the Siege of La Fère in 1596 (After the Siege of Calais). He was one of the first who (by that time being colonel) praised Louis XIII for having assassinated Concino Concini and regarded him as the true ruler. It was him who shouted: "Sire, at this hour you are king, for Marshal Ancre is dead." This exclamation marked the political raise of Ornano, for it pleased the insecure fifteen-year-old king who wanted to go down in history as "the Just" and justified his decision as a popular cause. That's also the reason why he put Ornano, along with a captain of the king's guards (Nicolas de l'Hôpital de Vitry) and the latter's brother in charge of the king's military orders in Paris in order to prohibit riots. After the "Wars of Mother and Son" (1619-1620), he also became governor of the king's brother, Gaston, Duke of Orléans. The royal heir really liked Ornano and did many things he said. In 1626 this even triggered the Chalais conspiracy, for Ornano persuaded Gaston not to follow the intentions of his mother and his brother to marry. Louis XIII responded by making a clever move by first appointing Ornano marshal of France and silently arresting Ornano during one of the king's lute concerts at court afterwards. Ornano was imprisoned and died of kidney and bladder ailments without having confessed anything in prison the same year.

References

1581 births
1626 deaths
People from Corsica
French marquesses

Prisoners of the Bastille